The discography of English alternative music singer/songwriter Badly Drawn Boy (real name Damon Gough) includes eight studio albums (including two soundtracks), one compilation, six extended plays and twenty-one singles. The first EP and several singles were released on Gough's own label "Twisted Nerve", which he started with like-minded Manchester musician Andy Votel. Badly Drawn Boy rose in popularity in 1997 when he joined the likes of Thom Yorke, Richard Ashcroft, and Mike D on the celebrity-filled UNKLE album Psyence Fiction. Due to the mild UK chart success of the 1999 single "Once Around the Block", XL Recordings signed up Badly Drawn Boy to release the debut album The Hour of Bewilderbeast in 2000. The album won critical praise and Britain's acclaimed Mercury Prize for Best Album. The album caught the attention of author Nick Hornby who then asked Gough to score the film being made for his book About a Boy.

Albums

Studio albums

Compilation albums

Extended plays
 EP1 (September 1997)
 EP2 (April 1998)
 EP3 (November 1998)
 It Came from the Ground (March 1999) - Chart Position: #1 [Budget Albums Chart] (2000) (UK)
 The Guardian Presents Badly Drawn Boy (2002) (6 tracks given away with The Guardian newspaper)
 BDB At The Britons Protection (15 December 2007) (rare limited edition 4 Track EP (only 100 Numbered Copies, Signed & Folded on the night by Damon himself for this Special Gig, for Family & Close Friends)

Singles

Other single releases
 2001: "Donna and Blitzen" (special Christmas 7" vinyl release; also appears on the 2003 holiday compilation album, Maybe This Christmas Too?)
 2006: "Born in the U.K." (limited edition vinyl release)
 2006: "Welcome to the Overground" (released under the name of Cubilas, 1 sided one-track 12" of the album track; limited to 500 copies)
 2007: "Promises" (limited edition 7" & 12" vinyl release/download release - not released as a CD-single)
 2008: "The Time of Times" (download release)
 2009: "Is There Nothing We Could Do?" (promo release)

Appearances and contributions
"Nursery Rhyme" (from Unkle's Psyence Fiction 1998)
All Oar Nothing (November 1998)
Christmas Stocking Filler (December 1998)
Modern Music For Motorcycles  (January 2000)
Bends For 166 Miles (24 April 2000)
Sounds Eclectic (Broadcast 17 November 2000) (2001)
Everything You Always Wanted To Know About Twisted Nerve But Were Too Afraid To Ask (1 October 2001)
"Come On Eileen" - Badly Drawn Boy & Jools Holland 1 Love (War Child Album)
Zoo (16 September 2002)
Uncut Born to Run Vol 1 (2003) (Bruce Springsteen's "Thunder Road")

References

Discographies of British artists
Rock music group discographies